Grawn is an unincorporated community and census-designated place (CDP) in Grand Traverse County in the U.S. state of Michigan. At the 2020 census, the community's population was 816.  The community is located within Blair Township, on the border witih Green Lake Township.

History

Grawn was founded in the 1870s as Blackwood after its first settler, James B. Blackwood. The Chicago and West Michigan Railway was built through Blackwood in 1890, and the village was renamed to Grawn Station, after Charles T. Grawn, the former superintendent of Central Michigan Normal School, and later the superintendent of Traverse City Area Public Schools. The same year, the name was shortened to Grawn, and given a post office with William H. Gibbs as the first postmaster. By 1905, potatoes had become the main crop of Grawn.

In December 1995, a fire broke out at Carl's Tire Retreading Company in Grawn. The fire burned for 20 days, and led to the evacuation of locals and of Blair Elementary School. In 2003, PFAS was found at the site and in local wells as a result of chemicals used to extinguish the fire.

The community of Grawn was listed as a newly-organized census-designated place for the 2010 census, meaning it now has officially defined boundaries and population statistics for the first time.

Geography

Major highways
 runs west–east at this portion of its route through the center of the community.

Demographics

References

Unincorporated communities in Grand Traverse County, Michigan
Unincorporated communities in Michigan
Census-designated places in Grand Traverse County, Michigan
Census-designated places in Michigan
Traverse City micropolitan area